Yaniv is a Hebrew male name meaning "he will prosper". It may also refer to:

 Yaniv (card game), an Israeli card game with no established rules
 Yaniv (village), south of Pripyat, Kyiv Oblast, Ukraine
 Yaniv, Ukraine, former name of Ivano-Frankove, Lviv Oblast, Ukraine

People
 Yaniv Green (born 1980), Israeli basketball player
 Yaniv Katan (born 1981), Israeli footballer
 Yaniv Perets (born 2000), Canadian ice hockey player
 Yaniv Schulman or Nev Schulman (born 1984), American TV host
 Idan Yaniv (born 1986), Israeli singer
 Jessica Yaniv (born 1986/1987), Canadian transgender activist

See also 
Janov (disambiguation)